Yoti (Yotti) is a member of the Leko–Nimbari group of Savanna languages, spoken in northeastern Nigeria.

External links 
•    Paradisec has an open-access collection of Roger Blench's materials that includes Yoti-language materials

References

Mumuye–Yendang languages
Languages of Nigeria